In cryptography, a padding oracle attack is an attack which uses the padding validation of a cryptographic message to decrypt the ciphertext. In cryptography, variable-length plaintext messages often have to be padded (expanded) to be compatible with the underlying cryptographic primitive. The attack relies on having a "padding oracle" who freely responds to queries about whether a message is correctly padded or not. Padding oracle attacks are mostly associated with CBC mode decryption used within block ciphers. Padding modes for asymmetric algorithms such as OAEP may also be vulnerable to padding oracle attacks.

Symmetric cryptography
In symmetric cryptography, the padding oracle attack can be applied to the CBC mode of operation, where the "oracle" (usually a server) leaks data about whether the padding of an encrypted message is correct or not. Such data can allow attackers to decrypt (and sometimes encrypt) messages through the oracle using the oracle's key, without knowing the encryption key.

Padding oracle attack on CBC encryption

The standard implementation of CBC decryption in block ciphers is to decrypt all ciphertext blocks, validate the padding, remove the PKCS7 padding, and return the message's plaintext.
If the server returns an "invalid padding" error instead of a generic "decryption failed" error, the attacker can use the server as a padding oracle to decrypt (and sometimes encrypt) messages.

The mathematical formula for CBC decryption is

As depicted above, CBC decryption XORs each plaintext block with the previous  block.

Suppose the attacker has two ciphertext blocks  and wants to decrypt the second block to get plaintext .
The server then returns whether or not the padding of the last decrypted block is correct (a valid PKCS#7 padding).
The attacker can modify the second-last byte (flip any bit) to ensure that the last byte is 0x01. (Alternatively, the attacker can flip earlier bytes and binary search for the position to identify the padding. For example, if modifying the third-last byte is correct, but modifying the second-last byte is incorrect, then the last two bytes are known to be 0x02, allowing both of them to be decrypted.) Therefore, the last byte of  equals .

The attacker then uses the same approach described above, this time modifying the second-to-last byte until the padding is correct (0x02, 0x02).

If a block consists of 128 bits (AES, for example), which is 16 bytes, the attacker will obtain plaintext  in no more than 256⋅16 = 4096 attempts. This is significantly faster than the  attempts required to bruteforce a 128-bit key.

Encrypting messages with Padding oracle attack (CBC-R) 

CBC-R  turns a decryption oracle into an encryption oracle, and is primarily demonstrated against padding oracles.

Using padding oracle attack CBC-R can craft an initialization vector and ciphertext block for any plaintext:
 decrypt any ciphertext Pi = PODecrypt( Ci ) XOR Ci−1, 
 select previous cipherblock Cx−1 freely, 
 produce valid ciphertext/plaintext pair Cx-1 = Px XOR PODecrypt( Ci ).

To generate a ciphertext that is N blocks long, attacker must perform N numbers of padding oracle attacks. These attacks are chained together so that proper plaintext is constructed in reverse order, from end of message (CN) to beginning message (C0, IV). In each step, padding oracle attack is used to construct the IV to the previous chosen ciphertext.

The CBC-R attack will not work against an encryption scheme that authenticates ciphertext (using a message authentication code or similar) before decrypting.

Attacks using padding oracles
The original attack was published in 2002 by Serge Vaudenay. Concrete instantiations of the attack were later realised against SSL and IPSec. It was also applied to several web frameworks, including JavaServer Faces, Ruby on Rails and ASP.NET as well as other software, such as the Steam gaming client. In 2012 it was shown to be effective against some hardened security devices.

While these earlier attacks were fixed by most TLS implementors following its public announcement, a new variant, the Lucky Thirteen attack, published in 2013, used a timing side-channel to re-open the vulnerability even in implementations that had previously been fixed. As of early 2014, the attack is no longer considered a threat in real-life operation, though it is still workable in theory (see signal-to-noise ratio) against a certain class of machines. , the most active area of development for attacks upon cryptographic protocols used to secure Internet traffic are downgrade attack, such as Logjam and Export RSA/FREAK attacks, which trick clients into using less-secure cryptographic operations provided for compatibility with legacy clients when more secure ones are available. An attack called POODLE (late 2014) combines both a downgrade attack (to SSL 3.0) with a padding oracle attack on the older, insecure protocol to enable compromise of the transmitted data. In May 2016 it has been revealed in  that the fix against Lucky Thirteen in OpenSSL introduced another padding oracle.

References

Cryptographic attacks
Transport Layer Security
Computation oracles